Wanyuan is a county-level city in the northeast of Sichuan province, People's Republic of China, located near the trisection of Sichuan, Chongqing, and Shaanxi. Tamping Township is its municipality seat. Wanyuan has more than 100.000 inhabitants.

Geography and climate
Wanyuan has a monsoon-influenced humid subtropical climate (Köppen Cwa), with cool, damp winters and hot, humid summers; winter temperatures are significantly cooler than in the Sichuan Basin. With monthly percent possible sunshine ranging from 20% in January and February to 49% in August, the city receives 1,372 hours of bright sunshine annually, with spring sunnier than autumn.

Transportation 
China National Highway 210

References

External links
Official website of Wanyuan Government

 
County-level cities in Sichuan
Dazhou